Arthur Atkinson (born 1911, date of death unknown) was a former international motorcycle speedway rider and promoter who appeared in the first Speedway World Championship final in 1936.

Career
Atkinson began riding motorcycles at the age of thirteen. He rode in trials and grasstrack before taking up speedway in 1928 with Blackpool.  In 1929 he joined Leeds, captaining the team, and in 1930 won the Western Australia Championship. In 1930 he joined the Johnnie Hoskins-managed Wembley Lions. The team won the Southern League but in the last league meeting of the season Atkinson was left unconscious after a crash. He missed the most of the 1931 season after a dispute with Wembley but in September 1931 he joined the West Ham Hammers.

Atkinson toured Australia in 1929/30, winning both the first of two Australian 2 mile Championship's held at the Exhibition Speedway in Melbourne, and the Western Australian Championship at the Claremont Speedway in Perth.

1936 saw Atkinson selected for England against Australia in the test series and was a regular up to the war.

In 1937 the Hammers won the National League Championship and in 1938 they won the ACU Cup. Atkinson remained with Hammers until the outbreak of World War II, in which Atkinson served in the Royal Air Force.

After the war he managed the West Ham Hammers alongside Stan Greatrex from 1946 until 1949. In 1950 Atkinson and his wife Eileen 'Tippy' Thorpe (whom he married in 1937 - they met while she was working as Johnnie Hoskins' secretary) became promoters at the newly formed Rayleigh Rockets. Whilst promoting at Rayleigh he returned to riding again, for West Ham, but the twelve years away from competitive riding showed in his scoring. In 1952 he was signed by the  Harringay Racers for £80 and scored reasonably well but after a poor start to 1953 Atkinson retired from racing for ever.

In addition to his speedway career, he ran a farm with his wife.

World final appearances
 1936 -  London, Wembley Stadium - 16th - 3pts + 6 semi-final points
 1937 -  London, Wembley Stadium - 14th - 6pts + 8 semi-final points
 1938 -  London, Wembley Stadium - 11th - 5pts + 5 semi-final points

Players cigarette cards
Atkinson is listed as number 2 of 50 in the 1930s Player's cigarette card collection.

References

1911 births
Year of death missing
British speedway riders
English motorcycle racers
Royal Air Force personnel of World War II
Speedway promoters
Harringay Racers riders
Leeds Lions riders
Wembley Lions riders
West Ham Hammers riders